The 2005 World Series by Renault- was the first season of Renault Sport's series of events, with three different championships racing under one banner.

Review

Formula Renault 3.5 Series

Eurocup Formula Renault 2.0

Eurocup Mégane Trophy

Race calendar
 Event in light blue is not part of the World Series, but is a championship round for the Formula Renault 3.5 Series.

Championships

Formula Renault 3.5 Series

Eurocup Formula Renault 2.0

Eurocup Mégane Trophy

References

 Linked articles contain additional references.

External links
 Official website of the World Series by Renault

Renault Sport Series seasons